George William Lord (15 August 1818 – 9 May 1880) was an Australian pastoralist, businessman and politician. He was a member of the New South Wales Legislative Council from 1877 until his death. He was also a member of the New South Wales Legislative Assembly between 1856 and 1877. Lord was the Colonial Treasurer in the third government of James Martin.

Early life
Lord was the seventh child of the ex-convict and pioneering entrepreneur Simeon Lord. At the age of 20 he began to acquire squatting runs in the Wellington district and by 1865 had the control of 672,000 acres.  He was also a director of numerous colonial companies including, coal mines, meat works and the Commercial Banking Company of Sydney. He married Elizabeth, a daughter of William Lee.

Colonial Parliament
At the first election under the new constitution Lord was elected to the Legislative Assembly as the member for Wellington and Bligh. He remained in the Assembly until 1877, representing Bogan after Wellington and Bligh was abolished at the 1859 election. He was an active politician who, by avoiding party intrigues was able to achieve a great deal for his electorate. He was a childhood friend of John Robertson and a supporter of James Martin. In 1877, he accepted a life appointment to the Legislative Council.

George's brother Francis (1812–1897), was a member of the Legislative Council for many years,

Government
Lord was Colonial Treasurer in the third government of Martin. He presented one budget to the Assembly, which was severely criticized and then amended because of a 10% ad valorem property tax.

References

 

1811 births
1888 deaths
Members of the New South Wales Legislative Assembly
Members of the New South Wales Legislative Council
Treasurers of New South Wales
Politicians from Sydney
19th-century Australian politicians